Wife Savers is a lost 1928 American comedy silent film directed by Ralph Ceder and written by Thomas J. Geraghty, Grover Jones, George Marion Jr. and Arthur Wimperis. The film stars Wallace Beery, Raymond Hatton, ZaSu Pitts, Sally Blane, Tom Kennedy and Ford Sterling. The film was released on January 7, 1928, by Paramount Pictures.

Plot

Louis Hozenozzle and 2d Lieut. Rodney Ramsbottom, two American soldiers, are stationed in Switzerland after World War I. Ramsbottom is in love with Colette, a pretty Swiss girl, and when he receives orders to leave Switzerland he orders Hozenozzle to remain there to protect Colette. General Lavoris, a Swiss, also desires Colette, but she spurns him. Returning home, he has a fake order issued stating that all unmarried women must immediately take husbands. At her request, Hozenozzle marries Colette. Ramsbottom then receives a letter from General Lavoris telling him that he has been doublecrossed, and the lieutenant immediately returns to Switzerland and challenges Hozenozzle to a duel. Colette intercedes, explaining that she married only to save herself from Lavoris. The mayor grants Colette a divorce from Hozenozzle, but all the suitors lose her to a handsome young major. [4]

Cast 
Wallace Beery as Louis Hosenozzle
Raymond Hatton as Rodney Ramsbottom
ZaSu Pitts	as Germaine
Sally Blane as Colette
Tom Kennedy as General Lavoris
Ford Sterling as Tavern Keeper
George Y. Harvey as The Major
August Tollaire as The Mayor

References

External links 
 
 

1928 films
1920s English-language films
Silent American comedy films
1928 comedy films
Paramount Pictures films
Films directed by Ralph Ceder
Lost American films
American black-and-white films
American silent feature films
1928 lost films
Lost comedy films
1920s American films